Marc Peter Tierney (born 23 August 1985) is an English former professional footballer who played as a left back most recently for Football League Championship club Bolton Wanderers. Predominantly a left back, Tierney could play in other positions, such as centre-back. His brother Paul is also a retired professional footballer.

A graduate of the Oldham Athletic Academy where he made his debut in 2003, he has also played for Carlisle United, Shrewsbury Town, Colchester United, and Norwich City.

Club career
Born in Prestwich, Greater Manchester, Tierney rose through the youth ranks at Oldham Athletic, making his professional debut for Oldham in a League Cup match in August of the 2003–04 season, against Scunthorpe United. In December 2004 he went to Carlisle United on loan for a three-month spell under Paul Simpson.

In January 2007, Tierney was signed by Shrewsbury Town in a two and a half year deal. He was a regular in the Shrewsbury side during the closing months of the 2006–07 season, as Town reached the League Two playoff final at Wembley. Notably, Tierney was sent off in the dying minutes of that game, making him only the second player to suffer this fate at the new stadium, and meaning he would miss the first game of the 2007–08 season.

In spite of Shrewsbury's disappointing 2007–08 season, Tierney enjoyed excellent personal form. His consistently dependable performances earned him both the fans' and players' player of the year awards.

Colchester United
On 27 November 2008 Tierney joined Colchester United on an initial five-week loan. The move was made permanent in the January transfer window. Tierney received his 1st red card against former employers Oldham.

Norwich City
On 12 January 2011, Tierney signed for Championship side Norwich City and was handed the number 32 shirt. The move came despite Tierney saying he would not move to Norwich "in a million years". He made his debut for The Canaries against Crystal Palace at Selhurst Park as a substitute for Adam Drury in a 0–0 draw, and made his first start in the 2–1 win over Millwall at Carrow Road. Once Norwich had completed promotion he joined in with the mass celebrations by doing numerous cartwheels on the pitch. He repeated a similar celebration during a pre-season friendly against Real Zaragoza when two of the floodlights failed after a lightning strike to "entertain the fans". Tierney was given squad number 23 ahead of the 2011–12 Premier League season and started on the opening day of the season. He was the only player to start the first 6 games of the season, establishing himself as first choice left back. He is affectionately known as "Mad Marc" by the Norwich fans. Tierney continued his run in the team, starting all of the games up to Christmas until a serious injury ruled him out for the rest of the season of what was an impressive season for the team. At the end of the 2012–13 season, it was announced Tierney was not to be given a new contract, allowing him to look for other clubs on a free transfer.

Bolton Wanderers
Following his release from Norwich City, Bolton Wanderers announced that Tierney would be joining the club when his contract with Norwich expired on 30 June 2013. He made his debut for Bolton in their 1–1 draw with Lancashire rivals Burnley on 3 August 2013. Tierney established himself as Bolton's first choice left-back before suffering an ankle injury in the club's 1–1 draw with Yeovil Town at the Reebok Stadium meaning a lengthy spell on the sidelines.

Retirement
On 23 April 2015, Tierney announced his retirement from professional football after failing to recover from his ankle injury.

International career
Aside from England, Tierney is also eligible to play for the Republic of Ireland national team. His brother Paul has previously represented Republic of Ireland at U21 level. Giovanni Trapattoni and Marco Tardelli were reported to have been keeping an eye on him ahead of Ireland's participation in UEFA Euro 2012.

Personal life
Marc is the brother of former Livingston player Paul Tierney.

Career statistics
Source:

Does not include Football League Trophy appearances.

Honours
Norwich City
Football League Championship runners-up: 2010–11

References

External links
 
 

1985 births
Living people
Sportspeople from Prestwich
English footballers
English people of Irish descent
Association football defenders
Oldham Athletic A.F.C. players
Carlisle United F.C. players
Shrewsbury Town F.C. players
Colchester United F.C. players
Norwich City F.C. players
Bolton Wanderers F.C. players
English Football League players
National League (English football) players
Premier League players